Xanthi Konstantinidou (born 2 January 1962) is a Greek former footballer and manager.

Career
Konstantinidou began her career as a footballer, playing as a centre forward for Olympiad Thessaloniki and Thessaloniki '80 from 1979 to 1983. In 1983, she became the first woman to receive an "A" coaching license in Greece. She began her coaching career with the Profodou Nafpaktos men's team from 1985 to 1987, before managing Olympiad '96 from 1987 to 1989. She also coached the women's team Centaur Larissa (1991 to 1992) and men's team Alexander (1994 to 1995). Konstantinidou was the technical adviser of the Greece women's national team from 2000 until 2002, before coaching the team from 2002 to 2004. She took charge of 57 matches of the team, finishing with a record of 19 wins, 12 draws and 26 losses. She was the team's coach at the 2004 Summer Olympics.

Personal life
Konstantinidou was born in the  community of the Doxato municipality. She graduated from the School of Physical Education and Sport Sciences at the Aristotle University of Thessaloniki, having specialised in football. She received a master's degree in coaching from the school's postgraduate study program in 2001, and earned a PhD from the Department of Physical Education of the Democritus University of Thrace. From 1993 to 1998 she taught at the Democritus University of Thrace, and at the Aristotle University of Thessaloniki since 2001. She has written multiple books, including "Football Book for Gymnasts" (1990) and "Football Handbook" (2002), and has published in scientific journals.

References

External links
 

1962 births
Living people
People from Drama (regional unit)
Greek women's footballers
Women's association football forwards
Greek women's football managers
Women's association football managers
Greece women's national football team managers
Aristotle University of Thessaloniki alumni
Democritus University of Thrace alumni
Academic staff of the Aristotle University of Thessaloniki
Female association football managers
Footballers from Eastern Macedonia and Thrace